Moscow Racer is a racing video game featuring driving in realistic streets of Moscow. The game includes a number of elements of a simulator (car cockpit view, detailed vehicles's specs, realistic streets).  The game has received the “Debut of the year 2008” award and the Game Developers conference Russia and had wide media and promotional campaign and had placed in Russian top 10 sales for several months, though the final version of the game received generally average or poor reviews.  

 

The game works under Windows only and was released in April 2009.

The Moscow Racer was developed by iRS Games Studio (Moscow, Russia) and published by Akella company (Moscow, Russia) in April 2009.

Announcement

The very first announcement of the Moscow Racer game was in Russia in October 2007. At the same time the first video of early technical demo was published.

Alexey Cardo, the producer of the Moscow Racer, was quoted in the very first press-release of the game, describing the ambitions of the studio as "We completely understand that we won't make an absolutely top-level game from the very first step...what we are going to do is to create a series of good and dynamic racing games. And after several releases, we plan to make products of world-best quality".

In April 2008 another video of improved version of the game was published.

Pre-release versions of the Moscow Racer had been demonstrated at a number of public events, including the 2008 E3 Expo. A number of sites and magazines have posted their previews of the game, mostly interested in the opportunity to race in highly-realistic streets of Moscow:

GamersInfo.net: "Da, comrade speed racer, here we go!"

"There are two things that really show up for a street racing game: credibility, in terms of having the verisimilitude of the racing, as well as the setting, have a unique and interesting setting that sets you firmly into position as to where and why you're racing. Moscow Racer does this on both counts... hopefully we'll get a chance to really sit down and see how it feels to put the pedal to the metal in a Ford Mustang on Moscow city streets".

GameSpot.com: "Moscow Racer is still very early on, but its intriguing locale should offer an interesting change of pace for PC game players, who don't have a lot of racing games to choose from these days, anyway."

In Russia the Moscow Racer had received a number of awards during development phase («The Best Debut of the Year» Russian Games developers Conference and other).

Expos and awards
Before the sales start, the Moscow Racer has been demonstrated at a number of large-scale automotive and videogames events:

1. Game Developers Conference Russia, 2008 (April 2008)

(At about the same time the second trailer of the game was released 2nd Moscow Racer trailer

2. «Tuning Days» (a tuners cars show, dedicated to the Moscow premier of the «Speed» movie at the Waypark mall, May 2008)

3. Super Car&Bike Show 2008 (May 2008)

4. "the day of the Upgrade magazine at the «Gorbushkin Dvor» mall (May 2008)

5. Arena Drive festival 2008 (June 2008)

6. AutoExotica 2008 (July 2008)

7. Moscow International Auto Show (August 2008)

Media partners 
The Russian release of the Moscow Racer game was co-promoted with a number of Russian media, with their logos placed on the cover of the game:

1. Mail.ru

2. Auto.ru

3. Maxim

4. 3DNews.ru

5. «Yerevan» magazine

6. «Bolshoi Sport» magazine

7. Computer Bild magazine

8. Stuff magazine

9. «What Hi-Fi?» magazine

Release, Reception and Sales
The final version of the Moscow Racer was released in Russia in spring of 2009, about a year later than expected, and has received poor critics` ratings, varying from "32 of 100" (bad) to "7.3 of 10".

Still, the Moscow Racer game has managed to reach top-10 sales ratings in a number of Russian distributors, including 
1. SOYUZ: 4th place (sales charts from April 20, 2009) 
2. Nastroeniye: 6th place (sales charts from May 21, 2009) 
3. Hit-Zona: 6th place (sales charts from May 21, 2009)

and had remained in Akella publishing company's top 10 for five months in a row:
4. April 2009 (10th place in the bestsellers chart), 
5. May (10th), 
6. June (10th), 
7. July (8th), 
8. August (9th).

In spite of positive expectations of worldwide media (during the development stage of the game), there were no releases of the Moscow Racer outside Russia.

Successors
«Rally Raid 2009: the Road to Dakar »  (unreleased)

In the summer 2008 iRS Games announced another racing game, also combining racing and, partly, Russia, focusing on KAMAZ rally trucks and the famous Dakar Rally. It was announced that the game will be "a simulator of racing through African continent, developed to support the KAMAZ  rally team, the proud of Russia and the 7-time winner of the legendary rally raid" (quote from the official press-release ). But ever since there were no neither publications on the project, no the game itself.

"Moscow Racer: the Auto Legends of the USSR"

In the end of 2010, year and a half after the release of the first Moscow Racer, iRS Studio and Akella publishing company have released in Russia a remake of the original game, named "Moscow Racer: Auto Legends of the USSR". The game was focuses on soviet cars of 1940s-1970s. The title partner of the game was the "Auto Legends of the USSR" magazine (DeAgostini publishing group).

References

2009 video games
Video games developed in Russia
Video games set in Moscow
Racing video games
Windows games
Windows-only games
Akella games
Single-player video games